Major General Anthony John Rawlins,  is a senior officer in the Australian Army. He joined the army via the Australian Defence Force Academy in 1986 and was commissioned into the Royal Australian Armoured Corps. He has commanded the 2nd Cavalry Regiment (2006–08), Overwatch Battle Group (West) (2006–07) and 7th Combat Brigade (2016–18), and deployed on operations to Israel and Lebanon, Iraq and Afghanistan. He served as Deputy Chief of Army from 2018 to 2022, and was appointed Head Force Design within the Vice Chief of Defence Force Group in February 2022.

References

|-

Australian generals
Australian military personnel of the Iraq War
Australian military personnel of the War in Afghanistan (2001–2021)
Graduates of the Australian Defence Force Academy
Living people
Members of the Order of Australia
Recipients of the Distinguished Service Cross (Australia)
Royal Military College, Duntroon graduates
University of New South Wales alumni
Year of birth missing (living people)